Anthony Charles Epstein (born June 17, 1952) is an associate judge of the Superior Court of the District of Columbia.

Education and career 
Epstein earned his Bachelor of Arts from Yale College in 1974, and his Juris Doctor from Yale Law School in 1977.

After graduating, he clerked for Judge Charles B. Renfrew of the United States District Court for the Northern District of California. In 1981, he started working in private practice. He joined Jenner & Block in 1983 and Steptoe & Johnson in 1999.

D.C. Superior Court 
President George W. Bush nominated Epstein on January 9, 2007, to a 15-year term as an associate judge of the Superior Court of the District of Columbia to the seat vacated by Susan Rebecca Holmes. On July 23, 2008, the Senate Committee on Homeland Security and Governmental Affairs held a hearing on his nomination. On July 30, 2008, the Committee reported his nomination favorably to the senate floor. On August 1, 2008, the full Senate confirmed his nomination by voice vote. He was sworn in on September 8, 2008.

References

1952 births
Living people
21st-century American judges
Judges of the Superior Court of the District of Columbia
Lawyers from New York City
Yale College alumni
Yale Law School alumni